This is a list of footballers who have played for the Republic of Ireland national football team. The Irish Football Association (IFA) was formed in 1880, prior to the partition of Ireland. The original Ireland national team was selected by the IFA and included players from all of Ireland. Following the creation of the Irish Free State, the Football Association of Ireland (FAI) was set up and it picked its own national team. Until 1950, both Irish associations picked players from the whole of the island, which resulted in there being many dual Irish international footballers. After complaints by the FAI against this practice being used by the IFA during 1950 FIFA World Cup qualification matches, FIFA decreed that each association should select teams based on their own part of Ireland.

During the 1958 FIFA World Cup qualification, a late goal by England allowed them to qualify at Ireland's expense. After reaching the quarter-finals of the 1964 European Nations' Cup, Ireland lost a 1966 FIFA World Cup qualification play-off against Spain. A run of poor results in the late 1960s and early 1970s followed until Johnny Giles became their first player-manager. This was followed by the debut of a young Liam Brady and results improved markedly. The side missed out on the 1978 FIFA World Cup by two points, having defeated France at home during qualification. Eoin Hand took over as manager for the 1982 FIFA World Cup qualifiers. Ireland again narrowly missed out on qualification, finishing behind France on goal difference. Disappointing qualifying campaigns for both UEFA Euro 1984 and the 1986 FIFA World Cup followed, ending Hand's time in charge.

Ireland then appointed Jack Charlton, who led the team to its most successful period, qualifying for two World Cups and a European Championship. Ireland's first appearance at a major finals tournament came in UEFA Euro 1988. Ireland beat England 1–0 and came within eight minutes of qualifying for the semi-finals. Ireland also qualified for the 1990 FIFA World Cup. Draws in the group stage against England, Egypt and the Netherlands was enough to earn a place in the second round, in which the team beat Romania on a penalty shootout. Ireland were then beaten 1–0 by Italy in the quarter final. During the tournament, the team had an audience with Pope John Paul II. After missing out on UEFA Euro 1992 despite being unbeaten in qualifying, Ireland qualified for the 1994 FIFA World Cup. The team beat Italy 1–0 in their opening game and reached the second round, losing 2–0 to the Netherlands. Ireland missed out on UEFA Euro 1996 after losing 2–0 to the Netherlands in a play-off at Anfield. It was Charlton's final game as manager.

Under new manager Mick McCarthy, Ireland missed out on the next two major tournaments, losing play-offs to Belgium and Turkey. Ireland took on Portugal and the Netherlands in 2002 FIFA World Cup qualification and ended the group in second place. Ireland then qualified for the World Cup by winning a play-off with Iran. Despite the loss of captain Roy Keane due to an infamous public spat in Saipan, the team progressed to the second round. After the match was drawn, Ireland lost 3–2 in a penalty shootout against Spain. After a poor start to qualifying for UEFA Euro 2004, McCarthy was replaced by Brian Kerr. He was unable to guide the side to Euro 2004 or the 2006 FIFA World Cup and was sacked in October 2005. Kerr was replaced by Steve Staunton in January 2006, but the team failed to qualify for UEFA Euro 2008 and Staunton lost the position in October 2007.

Veteran Italian coach Giovanni Trapattoni was appointed manager in February 2008. Trapattoni went through all ten first round 2010 FIFA World Cup qualifying games unbeaten, winning four of the ten games. Ireland lost out on a place in the World Cup after a controversial loss to France in the play-offs. In their Euro 2012 qualifying group Ireland finished second and qualified by winning a play-off against Estonia. Ireland lost all three matches at Euro 2012, against Croatia, Spain and Italy.

Key

A

B

C

D

E

F

G

H

I

J

K

L

M

N

O

P

Q

R

S

T

V

W

References

 
Association football player non-biographical articles